Dear Children is the  fourth studio album by Australian rock band The Black Sorrows. It was the band's first album released through CBS Records  in April 1987. According to Australian musicologist, Ian McFarlane, Dear Children "represented a turning point in the band's career".
The album peaked at number 22 on the Kent Music Report in June 1987.

Background and reception
The Black Sorrows had released three studio albums between 1984 and 1985 and had begun recording more original material. By November 1986 the Black Sorrows line-up was Joe Camilleri, Jeff Burstin, Peter Luscombe, Nick Smith and Johnny Charles, down from eleven members. Camilleri said that the line-up was "a lot more rockier but it has to be that way because all the gentle side of it has gone — the accordion player has gone. We still do some wonderful ballads but there is a big difference between a nine-piece band [as on the Sorrows' last tour] and a five-piece band, something has to go."

In November 1986, the band released "Mystified" which received significant radio play and peaked at number 24 on the Kent Music Report, this was the band's highest-charting single at that point. The band also performed the song on Countdown. Camilleri said; "I mortgaged the house to make Dear Children  and then CBS Records stepped in and said:  We like this record, we’ll buy it off you" The group signed to CBS for distribution. "Daughters of Glory" was released in March 1987 and made the top 50.

Track listing 
 Vinyl/ Cassette/ CD (CBS – 450924 1)

Charts

Personnel
 Accordion – George Butrumlis
 Acoustic Guitar, Mandolin, Tambourine – Jeff Burstin
 Backing Vocals – Nick Smith, Shirley Matthews, Venetta Fields 
 Bass – Mick Grabowski, Mike Girasole, Johnny Charles 
 Clarinet – John Barrett
 Drums – Peter Luscombe
 Electric Piano [Rhodes] – Don Nadi
 Guitar – Jeff Burstin, Tony Faehse
 Organ – Mick O'Connor
 Piano, Keyboards, Marimba – Paul Grabowsky
 Saxophone – John Barrett, Joe Camilleri
 Slide Guitar – Tony Faehse
 Trombone – John Courtney
 Trumpet – Bob Vinter
 Tuba – Karl Fritzlaff, Tim Jones

References

External links
 "Dear Children" at discogs.com

1987 albums
The Black Sorrows albums
CBS Records albums
Albums produced by Joe Camilleri